Danielle Franci Hanus (born March 16, 1998) is a Canadian swimmer who competes in the women's freestyle, backstroke, and individual medley competitions.

Career
She represented Canada at the finished 2014 Summer Youth Olympics in Nanjing, China, finishing 4th at the 50-metre backstroke, 7th at the 100-metre backstroke, 7th at the 200-metre backstroke and 13th  at the 100-metre butterfly. Newmarket native, she also has represented Canada at the 2014 Junior Pan Pacific Swimming Championships and the 2014 Australian Youth tour. She started swimming at age four and At age six started competing with the Newmarket Stringrays, where she continues to train and compete. Her most memorable career highlight to date was beating the age group record in the 100-metre backstroke 2013 Canada Games.

Personal best times
 https://www.swimming.ca/Rankings.aspx?page=athleteDetail&athleteId=4451772

References

External links
 
 
 
 
 
 Danielle Franci Hanus at the 2019 Pan American Games

1998 births
Living people
Canadian female backstroke swimmers
Sportspeople from Newmarket, Ontario
Swimmers at the 2014 Summer Youth Olympics
Swimmers at the 2019 Pan American Games
Pan American Games medalists in swimming
Pan American Games silver medalists for Canada
Medalists at the 2019 Pan American Games